Ethylphenol may refer to:

 2-Ethylphenol
 3-Ethylphenol
 4-Ethylphenol
 Ethyl phenyl ether (O-ethylphenol)